Nordhoff may refer to:
 Nordhoff High School, a public high school in Ojai, California.
 Nordhoff station, Chatsworth, Los Angeles
 Heinrich Nordhoff (1899-1968), German automotive engineer, managing director of Volkswagen 
 Charles Nordhoff (1887-1947), English-born author 
 Charles Nordhoff (journalist) (1830-1901), German-born, American journalist